Reichenbächle may refer to:

Reichenbächle (Schiltach), a river of Baden-Württemberg, Germany, tributary of the Schiltach
Reichenbächle (Breg), a river of Baden-Württemberg, Germany, tributary of the Breg